The Tsartlip First Nation is a First Nation located on the Saanich Peninsula, in Saanich territory on Vancouver Island.  They are a member of the Sencot'en Alliance fighting for Native rights.  In the 1850s they were signatories to one of the Douglas Treaties.

The band's reserve and offices are located near and to the north of the town of Brentwood Bay.

Past Chiefs

Treaty Process
Not participating in BC Treaty Process.

Demographics
INAC number 653, the Tsartlip First Nation has 766 members.

Notable Tsartlip
 Adam Olsen, BC MLA for Saanich North and the Islands

References

Coast Salish governments
Southern Vancouver Island